The 1989 Ottawa Rough Riders finished the season in 4th place in the East Division with a 4–14 record and failed to qualify for the post-season.

Offseason

CFL Draft

Preseason

Regular season
In a game against the Ottawa Rough Riders on October 9, 1989, Pinball Clemons scored his first CFL touchdown.

Standings

Schedule

Awards and honours

CFL Awards
None

CFL All-Stars
DS – Scott Flagel

References

Ottawa Rough Riders seasons
1989 Canadian Football League season by team